Brenda Russell (née Gordon; born April 8, 1949) is an American singer-songwriter, producer, and keyboardist. Russell has a diverse musical range which encompasses R&B, pop, soul, dance, and jazz. She has received five Grammy nominations.

Life and background
Brenda Gordon was born to musician parents, with her mother being a singer/songwriter and her father Gus Gordon (1926-2019), a one-time member of the Ink Spots. She spent her early years in Canada after moving to Hamilton, Ontario, at the age of 12. As a teenager she began performing in local bands and was recruited to sing in a Toronto-based girl group called The Tiaras alongside Jackie Richardson, Arlene Trotman, and Colina Phillips. The group's only single, "Where Does All The Time Go", was released on Barry Records in 1968 but was unsuccessful.

Career

1960s to 1970s

When Russell was 14 years of age she met the group Diane Brooks, Eric Mercury and The Soul Searchers. She would later open for them.  
In her late teens, she joined the Toronto production of Hair, during which time she had begun to play the piano. In the early 1970s, she married musician Brian Russell when they were both in the band Dr. Music. The couple went on to produce Rufus's "Please Pardon Me" (on their album Rufusized) and contribute backup vocals to Neil Sedaka's "Laughter in the Rain". 
The Russells also featured as backing vocalists for Elton John's concert at Wembley Stadium on June 21, 1975. Credited as Brian & Brenda, they released two albums on John's Rocket label being Word Called Love in 1976 and 1977's Supersonic Lover.

The duo also performed on two tracks from Robert Palmer's breakout soul-pop album Double Fun. Their daughter, Lindsay, was born in 1977, but the couple had divorced by the late 1970s, and Russell, now living in Los Angeles, had set out on a solo career.

In 1979, Russell's self-titled debut album was released by A&M Records. The album got to number 20 on the Billboard Top R&B/Hip-Hop Albums chart. A track from the LP called "So Good So Right" also got to number 8 on the Billboard Adult Contemporary Songs chart, number 15 on the Billboard Hot Soul Songs and number 30 on the Billboard Hot 100 chart.

1980s to 1990s
Russell went on to work with Earth, Wind & Fire as a producer on their 1980 album Faces and 1981 LP Raise!.
Russell released her sophomore album Love Life in 1981 on A&M. She also performed and produced on Patrice Rushen's 1981 LP Straight From The Heart and Donna Summer's 1982 album Donna Summer.

In 1983, she released her third album, Two Eyes, on Warner Bros. Records. The album got to number 16 on the Blues & Soul Top British Soul Albums chart in the UK.
Russell eventually relocated to Sweden where she began writing songs for her next album.

Returning to A&M Records, Russell's fourth album, Get Here, was released in 1988. It became her greatest commercial success, spawning her biggest hit "Piano in the Dark" (a US Top 10 hit which featured Joe Esposito) and garnered three Grammy Award nominations.

Russell then issued her follow up album, Kiss Me with the Wind, in 1990. The album got to number 25 on the UK Blues & Soul Top British Soul Albums chart. She then produced and guested on Phil Perry's 1991 album The Heart of a Man. The album rose to No. 17 on the Billboard Top R&B/Hip-Hop Albums chart. Russell also featured on the 1991 charity single "Voices That Care", which reached number 11 on the Billboard Hot 100 and number 6 on the Billboard Adult Contemporary Songs chart.

She later appeared on Joni Mitchell's 1991 LP Night Ride Home as well as on the Yellowjackets' 1992 album Live Wires.

She then released the album Soul Talkin' in 1993 on EMI Records.  Russell went on to produce Diana Ross on her 1995 LP Take Me Higher. The album got to number 10 on the UK Pop Albums chart.
 She also contributed to the score for the 1998 film How Stella Got Her Groove Back and appeared in the film Liberty Heights where she also performed two songs for the film's soundtrack.

2000s
Russell returned to her solo career in 2000 with the album Paris Rain, released on Hidden Beach Records. The album (which includes collaborations with Carole King, Dave Koz and Sheila E.) saw Russell move away from the pop market toward a more adult-oriented sound. In 2003, she signed to the new UK label Dome Records and released the compilation album So Good, So Right: The Best of Brenda Russell. Her eighth studio album, Between the Sun and the Moon, was released by Dome in 2004.

In 2005, saw a Broadway musical version of Alice Walker's The Color Purple. Produced by Oprah Winfrey, the show's score was written by Russell and lyricists-composers Allee Willis and Stephen Bray. Russell and her co-writers were nominated for a Tony Award (for Best Score) and a Grammy Award (in the Best Musical Show Album category).

In 2015, Russell, after making her home in Los Angeles for 30 years, took up residence in Texas.

In 2016, Russell received a Grammy nomination for The Color Purple in the category of Best Musical Theater Album.

Legacy
Russell has been covered by artists such as Babyface, Oleta Adams, The Manhattan Transfer, Luther Vandross, Patti Austin, Ruben Studdard, Donna Summer and Ramsey Lewis. She has also been sampled by artists such as Janet Jackson, Tupac Shakur, Chance the Rapper, Thalia, Flo Rida, Ariana Grande, and Big Pun ("Still Not a Player").

Artists such as Hot Chip have also been influenced by Russell.

Accolades

Grammy Awards

The Grammy Awards are awarded annually by the National Academy of Recording Arts and Sciences. Russell has received a total of five Grammy nominations altogether.

Tony Awards

Russell has also been nominated for a Tony Award.

Discography

Filmography
Russell featured as a singer in the feature films American Hot Wax,
The Santa Clause, and Liberty Heights.

References

External links
 Official website
 Dome Records
 
 
 
 Life And Soul Interview
Brenda Russell Interview NAMM Oral History Library (2020)

1949 births
Living people
Musicians from Brooklyn
African-American women singer-songwriters
Narada Productions artists
Rocket Records artists
Singer-songwriters from New York (state)
20th-century African-American women singers
21st-century African-American women singers